is the name given in Japan to the custom of blackening one's teeth with a solution of iron filings and vinegar. It was especially popular between the Heian and Edo periods, from the 10th century until the late 19th century, but the opening of the country to Western customs during the Meiji period led to its gradual disappearance. It was a tradition practiced mainly by married women and some men, almost always members of the aristocracy and samurai. In addition to Japanese society's preference for black teeth, it was also considered beneficial to health, as it prevented tooth decay by acting as a dental sealant. The practice of dyeing one's teeth black was also a known and widespread practice in southeastern China and Southeast Asia, although with different recipes.

Etymology 

The word  is composed of the honorific prefix , the term , and the term .  
Due to a phonological process called , the "k" in kuro voices to become a "g" sound, and the compound term is pronounced , not .

The term ohaguro arose among upper-class women in the early Edo period as part of nyōbō kotoba or "women's language", as a shift from the much-older term .  is normally spelled , but there is an alternative spelling  where the kanji literally mean "iron juice", alluding to the liquid used in the process. This alternative spelling also has a separate pronunciation, tesshō.

Origin and meaning 
 existed in Japan in one form or another for hundreds of years, and was considered a symbol of beauty for much of this time. Objects with a deep black color, such as those lacquered to a glossy black, were considered to be of great beauty, and many shades of black were used in dyeing kimono, with different shades holding different meanings.

The current Japanese female custom of covering the mouth when smiling derives to a greater or lesser degree from this consideration and from the preference until the 19th century for black-toothed rather than white mouths.

Among the samurai, its origin is associated with the idea of loyalty expressed by the color black.

History 

In the story, the protagonist's eccentric behavior is considered less reprehensible than her repulsive natural appearance, and a maiden describes her completely unplucked eyebrows as "hairy caterpillars" and her undyed teeth as "skinless caterpillars", while a captain of the guard who shows attraction to her is repelled by her lack of makeup and, above all, by her teeth which "shone horribly when she smiled."

The tradition first appeared among men and women of the Heian period aristocracy between the 9th and 11th centuries, which was soon followed by women of all social classes. It began as a rite of maturity among adolescent girls that by the end of this period had spread to noblemen. During the later Kamakura period, when aristocrats such as those belonging to the Taira clan, other samurai, and almost all nobles came of age, they dyed their teeth. In the particular case of samurai and members of the nobility of these periods it was customary to dye their teeth for the first time upon passing their  or initiation ceremony, at the age of fifteen or sixteen. This was also how it was done in the court of the Imperial Family until the end of the Edo period.

During the Muromachi period,  was common among adults, although even before the advent of the Sengoku period it was more often among nobles as a sign of the passage into puberty and was done on boys and especially girls entering that stage, around the age of 13.

The heads were identified and in many cases received  after decapitation to enhance the combatant's glory in defeating a notable enemy.

It was towards the end of this period that the men engaging in the practice became a minority.

During the Edo period, only men who were part of the Imperial Family and the aristocracy had their teeth blackened. Because of the strong odor and the effort required for the process, in addition to the impression among young women that it made them look older,  was only performed on women who were getting married or engaged, prostitutes, and geisha.

Until the last years of the Meiji period,  was still a popular custom among the middle and lower classes but from the Taishō period onwards it virtually disappeared except among elderly women in rural areas.

Social consideration and role 

Following the ending of Japan's self-isolation policy in the 1860s, a large number of Westerners who visited Japan – including Engelbert Kaempfer, Philipp Franz von Siebold and Rutherford Alcock, who visited Edo-period Japan – described  as "an abhorrent Japanese custom that disfigured their women", whom, in fact, many of them considered to be of great beauty until they smiled. Alcock surmised that its purpose would be chastity by intentionally making women unattractive, which would prevent potential extramarital affairs and his view of this custom hardly changed during his three-year stay in Japan:

Japanese sociologist Kyouji Watanabe disagrees with this theory.

Dye 
The main ingredient was a dark brown solution of iron acetate called , created by dissolving iron filings in vinegar. Covering the teeth with this liquid prevented decay of the teeth and enamel and was also said to ease the pain of dental ailments almost immediately. The dye faded quickly and had to be applied once a day or every few days to keep the dark shade even.

Among foreigners who knew of the custom, a rumor, never proven, spread that the ingredients also included urine. Algernon Freeman- Mitford transcribed in his Tales of Ancient Japan a recipe which he claimed had been described to him by a reputable apothecary in Yedo:

In kabuki theatrical performances, actors painted their teeth black whenever they played married women, courtesans, and with some noblemen, for which they traditionally used a mixture of brown sugar and pine resin. The mixture used in kabuki was given the name , and in more complex formulations could include wax, pine resin, carbon black, red pigment, rice honey, and lamp oil, all softened over a flame.

Application 

For the treatment, preservation and application of the dye, various containers and tools were used.

Each time the procedure was repeated, the teeth were carefully rubbed with the peel of a pomegranate to form an adhesive surface for the dye. According to Freeman-Mitford, the dye should be applied at most every two days, because even after the first day without a new coat, the teeth lost their lacquered shine and pieces of gray were mixed with those that maintained the desired black color, resulting in a repulsive appearance.

Superstitions, legends, and popular expressions 

 During the Meiji period, an urban legend spread that the coal tar used as insulation at the beginning of the extension of electrical wiring throughout Japanese cities was actually composed in part of the blood of virgins, an idea that became associated with the Westerners who were originally in charge of installing the wires. To avoid being attacked and have their blood drawn, many young women decided to change their appearance to look like married women: they dyed their teeth black, painted their eyebrows, wore simple kimono, and styled their hair in the  style.
 In Yamada Norio's book , in English Journey through the ghost stories of Tohoku, there is a story about Fukushima prefecture called .
 A legend from the island of Himeshima tells that, when  fled from Prince Tsunuga Arashito of the Gaya confederacy, she stopped for a moment on her journey to apply . When she then wanted to rinse her mouth she found no water anywhere nearby, so she clapped her hands and water began to gush out of the ground. That is the reason why the Hyoshimizu spring at Himekoso shrine is also called  (' water').
 The main red-light district in the country between the 17th century and the prohibition of prostitution in Japan in 1958 was Yoshiwara, in Edo. The district was surrounded on all four sides by a small moat with water that received the name , literally 'Black Tooth Canal', because of the abundance of prostitutes with dyed teeth.

Other parts of East Asia 

In China there has been knowledge of the custom of teeth blackening throughout history, although it was not practiced in the domains of the so-called Middle Kingdom, nor did its majority ethnic groups. As early as the 4th century's , the description of a 'black-toothed country' or  appears, which some associate with Japan itself and most others with the Southeast Asian area due to its extent in the region and greater antiquity.

In more modern times, tooth blackening can be observed among many minority groups in Southeast Asia. It is found preferentially among older women, although the practice still exists among some young girls. Sometimes artificial teeth were used to obtain black teeth although it is also very common outside Japan to achieve this result by continuously chewing betel nut, which gives a dark red shade instead of black, in addition to all sorts of plants collected mainly in the jungle.

The practice of teeth dyeing was very ancient in Vietnam, where it was considered a demonstration of maturity and readiness for marriage after puberty. It was also a demonstration of civilization, as there was an idea that white teeth belonged to animals, savages, and evil spirits, especially because of the presence of large protruding canines in all of them. The majority ethnic group in Vietnam, the kinh, practiced this custom, as did various minority populations. Si la men painted their teeth red, while women painted their teeth black. These traditions declined in the 20th century, decade by decade with each new generation, although colonial medical reports from the 1930s stated that 80 percent of Tonkinese farmers had darkened teeth.

In Thailand, teeth darkening was an established symbol of beauty, achieved for centuries with a paste called , and love poems used to compare the dyed teeth of the beloveds to ebony and other valuable woods. When the 19th-century Thai king Mongkut lost his teeth, he replaced them with artificial teeth carved from dark red sappan wood.

Peoples who practiced some form of tooth blackening outside of Japan include:

 In China, in Yunnan province, especially in Xishuangbanna prefecture, the ethnic groups: Jino, Blang, Dai, Yi, and Lisu.
 In Vietnam, the Si la, Kinh, Thổ, Nung, Maa, Mnong, and Rade ethnic groups.
 In Laos, the Khmu ethnic group.
 In Thailand, the Lahu, Akha, and Lisu ethnic groups.
 In Malaysia, the Malay, both in Peninsular Malaysia and Borneo, and the Jakun.
 In Indonesia, the Dusun, Dayak, Karo, Kodi, Alfur, Kedang, Ngada, and Batak.
 In Philippines, the Isnag, Aeta, Bicolano, Mangyan, Mansaka, Mandaya, Manobo, Yakan, Achinense, Minangkabau, Ivatan, Tausug, Bagobo, Kankanaey, Igorot, Gaddang, Ilongote, Makassar, Ifugao, Sondanese and Javanese.
 In the Pacific, the islands of Palau, Yap, and the Mariana Islands.

See also 

 Teeth blackening
 Culture of Japan
 Culture of Southeast Asia

Notes

References

Bibliography 

 
 
 
 

Japanese culture
Southeast (Vietnam)
History of cosmetics